Cranberry Creek may refer to:

Cranberry Creek (Blanchard River), a stream in Ohio
Cranberry Creek (Stony Creek tributary), a stream in Pennsylvania
Cranberry Creek (Yellow River tributary), a stream in Wisconsin
Cranberry Creek (Lake Erie), a watershed administered by the Long Point Region Conservation Authority, that drains into Lake Erie

See also
Cranberry Run